The Taitung Aboriginal Gallery is a gallery about indigenous peoples in Taitung City, Taitung County, Taiwan.

History

The gallery was established in 2016.

Architecture
The gallery was designed by Bio-architecture Formosana. It spans over an area of 1,921 m2. Its steel-framed roof resembles the shape of the ocean wave.

See also
 List of tourist attractions in Taiwan

References

2016 establishments in Taiwan
Buildings and structures in Taitung County
Cultural centers in Taiwan
Event venues established in 2016
Taiwanese indigenous peoples
Tourist attractions in Taitung County